The 19th National Television Awards was held at The O2 Arena on 22 January 2014. The event was presented by Dermot O'Leary, who himself was nominated for an award. The ceremony was broadcast live on ITV.

Ant & Dec, Coronation Street and Doctor Who were among the big winners, whilst Benedict Cumberbatch picked up the new TV detective award. This is the only ceremony not to feature the Special Recognition Award.

Awards

References

External links
Official website

National Television Awards
2014 in London
2014 in British television
2014 television awards
National Television Awards
N